A Great Escarpment is a major escarpment that typically runs parallel to the coast of a continent.  It may refer to:
 Great Escarpment, Australia
 Great Escarpment, Brazil
 Great Escarpment of India
 Great Escarpment, Southern Africa